Mullah Taj Mir Jawad, also spelt Tajmir Jawad, is the current Deputy Director of Intelligence of the Islamic Emirate of Afghanistan since 7 September 2021, alongside Rahmatullah Najib. He is a senior leader of the Haqqani network.

Career 
From 2008, Jawad was believed to be the operational head of several suicide attacks in Kabul as part of the "Kabul Attack Network", most notably the 2011 Inter-Continental Hotel Kabul attack. At this time, he was believed by Afghan and US officials to be living freely in Peshawar, Pakistan.

In 2018, Afghan Head of the National Directorate of Security Rahmatullah Nabil blamed Jawad for supervising the Al-Hamza Martyrdom Brigade, a training centre for suicide bombers that he said trained the assassin of police chief Abdul Raziq Achakzai, who had been assassinated that year.

On 7 September 2021, Jawad was made Deputy Director of Intelligence of the Islamic Emirate of Afghanistan, alongside Rahmatullah Najib, under Director of Intelligence Abdul Haq Wasiq.

References 

Living people
Taliban government ministers of Afghanistan
Year of birth missing (living people)